The 2006 Middle Tennessee Blue Raiders football team represented Middle Tennessee State University as member of the Sun Belt Conference during the 2006 NCAA Division I FBS football season. Led by first-year head coach Rick Stockstill, the Blue Raiders compiled an overall record of 7–6 with a mark of 6–1 in conference play, sharing the Sun Belt title with Troy. Middle Tennessee was invited to the Motor City Bowl, the program's first bowl game at the NCAA Division I Football Bowl Subdivision (FBS) level, where they lost to Central Michigan. The team played home games at Johnny "Red" Floyd Stadium in Murfreesboro, Tennessee.

Schedule

Starting lineup

Offense

Defense

Special teams

* Note: r before the class year means that the player has used a redshirt year.

Game summaries

FIU

Maryland

Tennessee Tech

Oklahoma

North Texas

Louisville

Louisiana–Monroe

Louisiana–Lafayette

Florida Atlantic

Arkansas State

South Carolina

Troy

Motor City Bowl

References

Middle Tennessee
Middle Tennessee Blue Raiders football seasons
Sun Belt Conference football champion seasons
Middle Tennessee Blue Raiders football